Erik LaRay Harvey (born 1972) is an American actor known for his roles as Dunn Purnsley in Boardwalk Empire, Willis Stryker / Diamondback in Luke Cage, and his role in The Charnel House (2016).

Early life
Erik LaRay Harvey was drawn into acting when he saw a theatrical performance of The Wiz. In his youth, he aspired to be a dentist.

Career
Harvey has performed in feature films, television series, and TV movies. Early TV roles include two episodes of Law & Order (1994 and 1998); two episodes of NYPD Blue (1997 and 2003); Now and Again; and Third Watch. He appears in two additional Law & Order series: Law & Order: Special Victims Unit (two episodes; 2003 and 2013) and Law & Order: Criminal Intent (one episode; 2005). Roles in feature films include Twister, The Caveman's Valentine and Rounders.

His two major roles have been on the HBO series Boardwalk Empire as Dunn Purnsley (2011–2013) and the Netflix series Luke Cage as Willis "Diamondback" Stryker.

Filmography

Film

Television

Video games

References

External links

American male television actors
Living people
New York University alumni
Place of birth missing (living people)
1972 births
21st-century American male actors
20th-century American male actors
American male film actors
American male video game actors
People from Bainbridge, Georgia
Male actors from Georgia (U.S. state)